Louise Etzner Jakobsson  (born 9 June 1960) is a Swedish female para-equestrian competing at Individual Championship test, Individual Freestyle test and Team test — grade III.

At the 2016 Summer Paralympics in Rio de Janeiro, Jakobsson and her horse, the 13 year-old Swedish Warmblood gelding Zernard 
, won a bronze medal with the score 70.341 percent at the Individual Championship test grade III event, and a bronze medal with the score 73.650 percent at the Individual Freestyle test grade III.

References 

1960 births
Living people
Swedish female equestrians
Paralympic equestrians of Sweden
Equestrians at the 2016 Summer Paralympics
Paralympic bronze medalists for Sweden
Medalists at the 2016 Summer Paralympics
Paralympic medalists in equestrian
21st-century Swedish women